Dalou may refer to :
 Dalou Mountains, a range of mountains in People's Republic of China
 Dalou, Ariège, a commune in the Ariège department in southwestern France
 Dalou, Yunnan, a Chinese border town in Yunnan Province
 Jules Dalou, a French sculptor